Saša Ocokoljić (born 21 October 1976) is a Serbian professional basketball coach and former player, who last served as head coach for CSO Voluntari of the Liga Națională.

References

External links
 Player profile at eurobasket.com
 Player profile at realgm.com
 Coach profile at eurobasket.com

1976 births
Living people
Bandırma B.İ.K. players
Basketball League of Serbia players
BC Balkan Botevgrad players
BC Kyiv players
CSU Asesoft Ploiești players
Keravnos B.C. players
KK Borac Čačak players
KK Lions/Swisslion Vršac players
OKK Beograd players
Serbian expatriate basketball people in Bulgaria
Serbian expatriate basketball people in Cyprus
Serbian expatriate basketball people in Israel
Serbian expatriate basketball people in Poland
Serbian expatriate basketball people in Romania
Serbian expatriate basketball people in North Macedonia
Serbian expatriate basketball people in Turkey
Serbian expatriate basketball people in Ukraine
Serbian men's basketball coaches
Serbian men's basketball players
Serbs of Montenegro
Sportspeople from Podgorica
Point guards